East Victoria Park is a suburb of Perth, Western Australia, located within the Town of Victoria Park.

East Victoria Park's post code is 6101.

References

 
Suburbs of Perth, Western Australia
Suburbs in the Town of Victoria Park